Rallapalli Ananta Krishna Sharma (23 January 1893 – 11 March 1979) was a noted composer of Carnatic music, singer, Telugu litterateur, teacher and Sanskrit scholar. He was responsible for discovering, cataloguing and putting to music many forgotten compositions of Annamacharya. These compositions composed hundreds of years ago came back to life thanks to Sharma's efforts and successive singers like S. P. Balasubramanyam and M. S. Subbalakshmi would sing many of them, hence popularising them. Sharma authored prose works like Vemana, Natakopanyasamulu, Ganakale, Sahitya Mattu Jeevana Kale and Saraswatalokamu. Rallapalli Ananta Krishna Sharma translated 395 (out of 700) Gathas from original Prakrit into Telugu language titled Shalivahana Gatha Sapta Saramu in 1931. Sharma is the recipient of Central Sangeet & Natak Academy Fellowship (1973), Gana Kala Sindhu (1961), Gana Kala Prapoorna (1969), Sangeeta Kala Ratna (1974) and Sangeeta Sahitya Asthan Vidwan honours with a Honorary Doctorate from TTD University, Andhra Pradesh.

Early life

Rallapalli Ananta Krishna Sharma was born on 23 January 1893 to parents Karnamadakala Krishnamacharya and Alamelu Mangamma. He was born in Rallapalli village in Kambadur taluk, Anantapur district, Andhra Pradesh. Sharma and his sister Yadugiramma used to sing religious hymns inside the local fort at Rallapalli. Sharma arrived in Mysore in 1905 at the age of twelve years and spent a year at Parakala Matha under the aegis of Krishnabrahmatantra Swamy. Sharma helped the Swamy in bringing out 'Alankara Manihara' - a treatise on Alankara Sastra. After his tenure at Parakala Matha, he went to Pandit Ramashastry in Chamarajanagar to learn Sanskrit. Later, in 1911, he married Rukminamma. Sharma lacked formal college or University education, but his proficiency in the traditional Sastras and musical compositions became his main strength. Rallapalli Ananta Krishna Sharma composed his first Sanskrit composition at the age of 14 years. It was a composition dedicated to Goddess Lakshmi titled 'Jalarashi Balelole'.

Musical Training

While in Mysore, Sharma frequented Carnatic musical concerts by Veena Seshanna, Veena Subbanna, Karigiraya, Mysore Vasudevacharya, Bidaram Krishnappa and Chikka Ramaraya. His repeated attempts at persuading these maestros to take him as a formal student of music were unsuccessful. Finally, Bidaram Krishnappa agreed to teach Carnatic music to Rallapalli Ananta Krishna Sharma. Krishnappa convinced Sharma not to participate in public expositions of his music in concerts and so on. Even when Muthiah Bhagavatar wanted to arrange a private concert for the ruling Maharaja of Mysore - Nalwadi Krishna Raja Wodeyar, Sharma declined it.

Teacher

Sharma was appointed a Telugu Pundit (a scholar) by Sir Cattamanchi Ramalinga Reddy, Principal of the Maharaja College of Mysore in 1912 and worked until 1949.(group photo) After which he joined the Sri Venkateshwara Oriental Research Centre, Tirupathi. The then executive officer of Tirumala Tirupati Devasthanams, Chelikani Anna Rao entrusted Sharma with elucidating the compositions of the great songwriter-singer-saint Tallapaka Annamacharya. These compositions (or kritis) were stored for centuries in the Tirumala temple Bhandagaram (storehouse) on copper plates. Sharma received the project after his predecessor, Veturi Prabhakara Sastry died. He singularly worked on tuning the songs and helped publish seventh and eighth volumes of Annamacharya's compositions. Sharma went on to edit nearly 300 compositions and brought out five more volumes of compositions between 1951 and 1956. He also wrote the notation for 108 compositions and 87 of them were published in the Andhra Patrika. Rallapalli Ananta Krishna Sharma was closely associated with eminent journalist, biographer and writer S. R. Ramaswamy who learnt for sometime the subtle nuances of Carnatic music from the maestro. Among his illustrious students are D. L. Narasimhachar, M. Chidananada Murthy, K. V. Puttappa, G. P. Raja Ratnam, M. V. Seetharamaiah, T. S. Shama Rao, B. Kuppuswami, G. S. Shivarudrappa and M. S. Venkata Rao.

Major works
 Ananta Bharati (collection of Sanskrit works) 
 Meerabai (1913) (Telugu Khanda Kavya) 
 Taradevi (1911) (Telugu Khanda Kavya) 
 Vemana Natakopanyasamulu (1928–29) 
 Shalivahana Gatasaptashati Saramu (1932) (translation work from the Prakrit into Telugu) 
 Saraswatalokamu (1954) 
 Chayapa Senaniya, Nrita Ratnavali (1969) (Translation into Telugu) 
 Arya (1970) (Translation of Sanskrit work of Sundara Pandya into Telugu)
 Natakopanyasamulu

Literary works in Kannada
 Ganakale (1952), 
  Sahitya Mattu Jeevana Kale (1954 ) 
  a few published talk.

Awards
 He was honored as "Astana Vidwan" by Tirumala Tirupati Devasthanams in 1979
 "Sangita Kalanidhi" in 1974
 Honorary Doctorate (D.Litt.) by Sri Venkateswara University, Tirupathi in 1974
 "Ganakala Sindhu" at Sangeeta Sammelan organized by Sri Prasanna Seetarama Mandiram, Mysore in 1961
 "Gana Kala Prapurna" by Andhra Pradesh Sangeeta Nataka Academy
 "Sangeeta Kalaratna" by Bangalore Gayana Samaj

Birth Centenary
Sharma died on 11 March 1979 in Bangalore and was survived by three daughters and two sons. On 23 August 2008, his life-size bronze statue was installed in Tirupathi. Birth Centenary Celebrations of Rallapalli Ananta Krishna Sharma were organized in 1993. A Centenary Souvenir was edited by Medasani Mohan and published by Tirumala Tirupati Devasthanams in 1994.

References

External links
 Official website of Rallapalli Anantha Krishna Sharma
 Biography of Rallapalli Ananta Krishna Sharma

Telugu people
Carnatic composers
1893 births
1979 deaths
Indian male composers
People from Anantapur district
Recipients of the Sangeet Natak Akademi Fellowship
Telugu-language writers
Academic staff of Maharaja's College, Mysore
20th-century Indian composers
Sri Venkateswara University alumni
Writers from Andhra Pradesh
Musicians from Andhra Pradesh
20th-century male musicians